Oregon Culinary Institute (OCI) was a privately owned, for-profit, accredited trade school located in Portland, Oregon, United States that was part of the Pioneer Pacific College system. It offered programs in culinary arts, baking and pastry, and restaurant management, with a curriculum to prepare graduates for the food-service industry. OCI's campus was located in the Goose Hollow neighborhood of southwest Portland, and included a restaurant staffed by students. Their slogan was "Training Kitchen People".

In 2018, OCI instructor Daniel Brophy was murdered at the Oregon Culinary Institute by his wife.

History 

In 2006, Eric Stromquist and Brian Wilke started Oregon Culinary Institute. The school offered a range of programs from diplomas to a range of different degrees. Stromquist remained president through 2015.

In July 2020, Pioneer Pacific College notified the state agencies that it planned to permanently close the downtown Portland OCI location along with other three art campuses in Portland, Beaverton and Springfield. This was in anticipation of a sharp decline in enrollment due to COVID-19.

Facilities and programs 

OCI's programs were taught in a  campus that included lecture classrooms and three computer labs. OCI taught and employed sustainable business practices, including partnering with farmers, ranchers, and fishermen to source local ingredients.

Restaurant 
As an extension of the culinary arts, baking and pastry, and restaurant management classrooms, OCI had an open-to-the-public restaurant able to accommodate up to 50 guests. Students prepared and served all lunches and dinners. The restaurant was open Monday through Friday, offering a three-course lunch and a four-course dinner.

References 

2006 establishments in Oregon
Cooking schools in the United States
Educational institutions established in 2006
Universities and colleges in Portland, Oregon